Irina Kaydashova (born April 2, 1985 in Tashkent) is an Uzbek taekwondo practitioner, who competed in the women's featherweight category. She became one of the first taekwondo fighters in history to represent Uzbekistan at the 2004 Summer Olympics, and later attained a quarterfinal finish in the 53-kg division at the 2010 Asian Games in Guangzhou, China.

Kaydashova qualified for an all-female Uzbek taekwondo squad in the women's featherweight class (57 kg) at the 2004 Summer Olympics in Athens, by placing second behind Thailand's Nootcharin Sukkhongdumnoen and granting a berth from the Asian Olympic Qualifying Tournament in Bangkok, Thailand. Kaydashova moved directly into the quarterfinals with a first round bye in a provisional seeding draw, but she crashed out early to Mexico's Iridia Salazar on the referee's decision after their match ended in a 7–7 tie. With Salazar losing the semifinal bout to South Korea's Jang Ji-won, Kaydashova denied her chance to compete for the Olympic bronze medal in the repechage.

References

External links

1985 births
Living people
Uzbekistani female taekwondo practitioners
Olympic taekwondo practitioners of Uzbekistan
Taekwondo practitioners at the 2004 Summer Olympics
Taekwondo practitioners at the 2010 Asian Games
Sportspeople from Tashkent
Asian Games competitors for Uzbekistan
21st-century Uzbekistani women